The Confederation Centre Art Gallery (CCAG) is an art museum that forms a part of the Confederation Centre of the Arts in Charlottetown, Prince Edward Island, Canada. The art museum pavilion forms the northeast portion of the Confederation Centre of the Arts complex, and includes seven exhibition rooms that equal  of space.

The art museum was opened in honour of the Fathers of Confederation, in October 1964, along with the rest of the Confederation Centre of the Arts. The art museum's permanent collection includes over 17,000 works, primarily from Canadian artists. Its exhibition spaces feature contemporary and historical exhibitions year-round, as well as special events, public lectures, and educational programming.

History
The Confederation Centre of the Arts was built from 1963 to 1964 in order to commemorate the Fathers of Confederation. Built in a Brutalist style by Montreal firm Affleck, Desbarats, Lebensold, Michaud & Sise, it was seen as "prototype for the Centennial building program, inciting other provinces and cities to start thinking of a more permanent monument of the year". The federal government provided C$2.8 million, while the provincial governments provided C$0.15 for each resident in their respective provinces. On 6 October 1964, the 100th anniversary of the Charlottetown Conference, the Confederation Centre of the Arts was opened by Queen Elizabeth II. The Confederation Centre of the Arts included the Confederation Centre Art Gallery, and several venues for the performing arts. The centre formally belongs to the federal and provincial governments of Canada, although the Government of Prince Edward Island acts as its custodian.

Following an investigation into several works in its permanent collection in the mid-2010s, the museum corrected the attribution to several works to its correct painter, Caroline Louisa Daly. A two-year investigation into the matter by the museum was launched in 2014 shortly after it was informed of the issue by a great-grandchild of Daly, who recognized her signature on one of the works. Following the correction, the museum organized an exhibition to exhibit works by Daly.

Architecture

The Confederation Centre Art Gallery building is located in the central business district of Charlottetown, and is situated west of Province House. The art museum forms a part of the larger Confederation Centre of the Arts building complex, which also contains a public library, restaurant, a 1,102-seat theatre for the performing arts, two studio theatres, and several event venues. Designed by Affleck, Desbarats, Dimakopoulos, Lebensold, and Sise, the Brutalist style structure began construction in 1963, and was completed in 1964. Designed by Dimitri Dimakopoulos, the exterior of the structure features a reinforced concrete frame, faced with a continuous wall of smooth sandstone. On 30 June 2003, the entire structure was designated as a National Historic Site of Canada.

The building is made of four constituent pavilions which together form a single building; however their exteriors were designed to be visually distinct from one another, giving the appearance that the pavilions are separate buildings. Three of these pavilions are situated in a U-shape around a fourth "Memorial Hall" pavilion; with the Confederation Centre Art Gallery located in the northeast pavilion of the U-shaped building complex.

The art gallery pavilion is three storeys, and has a low geometric massing that is used throughout the entire structure. There are two access points for the art museum pavilion, an entrance to the south that provides access from the inside the other pavilions of the Confederation Centre of the Arts, and an entrance to the north that provides access from the outside.

Permanent collection

As of June 2017, the art museum's permanent collection includes over 17,000 works by Canadian artists. The permanent collection began in 1964, and has a mandate to develop exhibit Canadian visual arts, with and its collection reflect on Canadian identity and the origin and evolution of the country. Works in the collection were either directly purchased from the art museum, bequeathed to, or donated to the art museum.

The collection includes digital media presentations, drawings, installation art, painting, photography, printmaking, sculptures. Most of the museum's holdings are works of contemporary art; although its collection does include works from the 19th and early 20th centuries, including works by Fanny Amelia Bayfield, Kathleen Daly, Cornelius Krieghoff, and George Pepper. The museum's collection includes specialized areas, like the Confederation Mural Collection, which includes works by Jean Paul Lemieux, and Jane Ash Poitras. The collection also includes works by Indigenous Canadians, including Robert Houle.

The museum's permanent collection also includes a specialized historical components, featuring a specialized research collection of works by Robert Harris, and the Lucy Maud Montgomery Collection, which includes sixteen novel manuscripts from the author. The Expo 67 Collection of Fine Craft features works made for the 1967 World's Fair.

See also
 List of art museums
 List of museums in Prince Edward Island

References

External links
 

Art museums and galleries in Prince Edward Island
Buildings and structures in Charlottetown